Fake Star ~I'm Just a Japanese Fake Rocker~ (stylized in all caps; commonly abbreviated to Fake Star) is the seventh studio album by the Japanese rock band Kuroyume, released on May 26, 1996, by EMI. The song "Pistol" won an International Viewer's Choice Award at the 1996 MTV Video Music Awards. Fake Star peaked at the number one on the Oricon Albums Chart and sold 203,660 copies in its first week.

Track listing

Personnel 
 Kiyoharu (清春) - singing
 Hitoki (人時) - bass

References 

Alternative rock albums by Japanese artists
Japanese-language albums
1996 albums